Abdul Rehman Muzammil (born 31 July 1989) is a Pakistani cricketer. He made his first-class debut for Multan in the 2013–14 Quaid-e-Azam Trophy on 22 October 2016.

In April 2018, he was named in Punjab's squad for the 2018 Pakistan Cup. In September 2019, he was named in Southern Punjab's squad for the 2019–20 Quaid-e-Azam Trophy tournament.

References

External links
 

1989 births
Living people
Pakistani cricketers
Multan cricketers
Khan Research Laboratories cricketers
Punjab (Pakistan) cricketers
Place of birth missing (living people)
Southern Punjab (Pakistan) cricketers